Vasilis Xerovasilas (born ) is a retired Greek male volleyball player and volleyball coach. He has 34 appearances with Greece men's national volleyball team. He played for Olympiacos for 7 years (1985-1992), winning 6 Greek Championships.

Clubs
  Messiniakos (1974-1985)
  Olympiacos (1985-1992)

References

External links
 Vasilis Xerovasilas interview
 Vasilis Xerovasilas: 6 Greek Championships with Olympiacos

1963 births
Living people
Greek men's volleyball players
Olympiacos S.C. players
Sportspeople from Kalamata